Jochen Babock (born 26 August 1953 in Erfurt) is an East German bobsledder who competed in the mid-1970s. He won the gold medal in the four-man event at the 1976 Winter Olympics in Innsbruck.

References
 Bobsleigh four-man Olympic medalists for 1924, 1932–56, and since 1964

1953 births
Living people
Sportspeople from Erfurt
People from Bezirk Erfurt
German male bobsledders
Olympic bobsledders of East Germany
Bobsledders at the 1976 Winter Olympics
Olympic gold medalists for East Germany
Olympic medalists in bobsleigh
Medalists at the 1976 Winter Olympics